Blythe Bridge railway station in Blythe Bridge, Staffordshire, England, is served by trains on the Crewe to Derby Line; it is also a Community rail line known as the North Staffordshire line. The station is owned by Network Rail and managed by East Midlands Railway. The full range of tickets for travel are purchased from the guard on the train at no extra cost.

The station was opened on 7 August 1848 by the North Staffordshire Railway (NSR).  Until 1907 the spelling of the station name was Blyth Bridge. The station buildings were demolished in the early 1990s and today it is unstaffed.

In 2010 it won East Midlands Trains' Best Small Station award.

Signalling
Blythe Bridge had at one time two signal boxes, Blythe Bridge and Stallington, both of which controlled level crossings, which was a common feature across the former NSR.

Blythe Bridge signal box was opened by the NSR in 1884 on their Derby to Stoke line. The box was built to a standard McKenzie & Holland design and under the S.R.S. designation system is referred to as a MKH Type1.

The signal box was equipped with a standard McKenzie & Holland lever frame and a gate wheel for operating the level crossing gates which controlled traffic on the busy former A50. These gates were later replaced by a barrier crossing when traffic got too heavy for the signalman.

Blythe Bridge signal box finally closed in 1980 and the level crossing was converted to CCTV control with the barriers supervised by Caverswall signal box.

Services
All services at Blythe Bridge are operated by East Midlands Railway.

During the late evenings, services terminate at Nottingham instead of Newark Castle.

On Sundays, the station is served by an hourly service between Crewe and Derby only although no trains operate before 14:00.

Foxfield Railway

References

Further reading

External links

Page with more info on the station 
 Railways in Draycott
Photographs of the old station buildings
Photograph of Blythe Bridge Signal Box 

Staffordshire Moorlands
Railway stations in Staffordshire
DfT Category F2 stations
Former North Staffordshire Railway stations
Railway stations in Great Britain opened in 1848
Railway stations served by East Midlands Railway